Chichimecacihuatzin II ('Little/Revered Chichimec Woman') was an Aztec princess of Tenochtitlan in Mexico.

Etymology 
The Nahuatl name Chīchīmēcah (plural, pronounced ; singular Chīchīmēcatl) means "inhabitants of Chichiman"; the placename Chichiman itself means "Area of Milk". The word could either have a negative "barbarous" sense, or a positive "noble savage" sense.

Biography
Chichimecacihuatzin was a daughter of Emperor Moctezuma I and his cousin-wife, Queen Chichimecacihuatzin I, after whom she was named.

She was a granddaughter of the king Cuauhtototzin and emperor Huitzilihuitl.

Her sister was Atotoztli II and her nephews were kings Axayacatl, Tizoc and Ahuitzotl. They all ruled over Tenochtitlan as great emperors.

Her husband was Huehue Huanitzin, a "great leader" of Itztapalapan and her son was Chimalpilli I (died in 1465). He was the first king of Ecatepec.

References

Princesses
Pagans
Tenochca nobility

15th-century indigenous people of the Americas
Nobility of the Americas